Craig Raymond Robert Foss (born 4 July 1963) is a New Zealand investment banker and politician.

Early years and family
Foss was born on 4 July 1963 in Lower Hutt, the son of Raymond Foss and Rosemary Dwyer. He attended Victoria University of Wellington, completing a BCA. He worked in the banking sector. He was Chief Dealer for the Bank of New Zealand. Subsequently, he worked for Credit Suisse Financial Products as Interest Rate Risk Manager in London and Tokyo.

Foss married Kristal in 1993; they have two daughters together. Foss owns a small farm and some tourist accommodation.

Political career

Member of Parliament 

Foss represented the Tukituki electorate for twelve years but was not successful in winning the electorate at his first attempt. He was ranked 47th on the National Party list, not high enough to enter Parliament as a list MP.

He was returned for three further elections and his majority peaking at nearly 10,000 votes in 2011. Foss voted in favour of the Marriage (Definition of Marriage) Amendment Act 2013.

The National Party formed a government in 2008. Foss was the chair of the Finance and Expenditure Committee from 2008 until June 2011, when he was appointed a minister outside Cabinet. He held the Civil Defence, Racing and Senior Citizens portfolios, as well as associate ministerial responsibilities in local government and commerce, replacing John Carter who left to take up a High Commissioner post in the Cook Islands.

After the 2011 election, Foss was promoted to be a minister inside the Cabinet, as Minister of Broadcasting and Minister of Commerce. He was also an associate minister in the education and ACC portfolios. As associate minister of education, Foss had responsibility for the ill-fated rollout of Novopay. In January 2013 he was removed from the education portfolio and reassigned to be Minister of Consumer Affairs. In this term he also held brief acting appointments as Minister for Climate Change Issues, after the 2012 resignation of Nick Smith, and as Minister for ACC, after the 2014 resignation of Judith Collins.

National was elected for a third term in 2014, and Foss was appointed Minister for Small Business, Minister of Statistics, Minister of Veterans' Affairs, Associate Minister of Immigration, and Associate Minister of Transport, but no longer served in the Cabinet. On 14 December 2016, following a change to the National Party leadership, Foss announced that he would retire from politics at the 2017 general election. He relinquished his ministerial roles on 20 December 2016. The Tukituki electorate was won at the election by Lawrence Yule, who had succeeded Foss as the National Party's candidate.

Local government 
Foss was elected to the Hawke's Bay Regional Council in the 2019 New Zealand local elections, alongside his former parliamentary rival Rick Barker.

References

External links
Craig Foss MP official site
Profile at National party

|-

|-

1963 births
Living people
New Zealand National Party MPs
People from Lower Hutt
Victoria University of Wellington alumni
Unsuccessful candidates in the 2002 New Zealand general election
Members of the New Zealand House of Representatives
New Zealand MPs for North Island electorates
21st-century New Zealand politicians